The Henley Festival of Music and the Arts is held, at Henley on Thames, each July, on the Berkshire bank of the River Thames, at the same spot and using adapted facilities from the Henley Royal Regatta, which is held the week before.

The main stage floats on the river and the audience use one of the grandstands. Each evening it normally features a light classical music concert, with jazz later in the evening. There are other smaller stages, art exhibits, roving performers, outdoor restaurants, etc.

Performers during 7–11 July 2010 include Nigel Kennedy, Bryn Terfel and Will Young.

Performers during 10–14 July 2013 include Jamie Cullum, Madness and Paloma Faith.

References

External links 
 Festival website

1982 establishments in England
Classical music festivals in England
Henley-on-Thames
Festivals in Berkshire
Henley Royal Regatta
Culture associated with the River Thames
July events
Music festivals in Berkshire

Music festivals established in 1982
Festivals established in 1982